Andy Bracek (born 21 March 1987) is a Wales international rugby league footballer who plays as a  and  forward for the Leigh Centurions in the Betfred Championship.

Background
Bracek was born in Leigh, Greater Manchester, England.

Playing career
He played at representative level for Wales, and at club level for Leigh Miners Rangers, St. Helens, Warrington, Barrow (two spells) and Crusaders RL.

Bracek attended Bedford High School in Bedford, Leigh, leaving in 2003. Throughout his childhood, Bracek trained and played at Leigh Miners Rangers, progressing through the ranks until St. Helens signed him to a youth deal as a teenager.

In November 2004, Bracek handed in a written transfer request at St. Helens and would go on to sign for Warrington for a fee of £20,000.

Bracek was named in the Wales squad to face England at the Keepmoat Stadium, Doncaster prior to England's departure for the 2008 Rugby League World Cup.

References

External links
Swinton Lions profile
(archived by web.archive.org) Barrow Raiders profile
Profile at warringtonwolves.com
Profile at saints.org.uk
Statistics at wolvesplayers.thisiswarrington.co.uk

1987 births
Living people
Barrow Raiders players
British people of Polish descent
Crusaders Rugby League players
English people of Welsh descent
English rugby league players
Halifax R.L.F.C. players
Rugby league players from Leigh, Greater Manchester
Rugby league second-rows
St Helens R.F.C. players
Swinton Lions players
Wales national rugby league team players
Warrington Wolves players